The Experimental Psychology Society (EPS) is an academic society which facilitates research into experimental psychology and communication between experimental psychologists.  It is based in the United Kingdom.

The society was originally formed as the "Experimental Psychology Group" by Oliver L. Zangwill in 1946.  The first meeting was held in the rooms of Professor Frederic Bartlett, in St. John's College, Cambridge.
EPS in co-operation with The British Psychological Society published guidelines for members engaged psychological activities involving living animals.
The Group became the EPS in 1958, the transition being handled by the then president, W. E. Hick.

The society publishes The Quarterly Journal of Experimental Psychology (QJEP).

References

External links
http://www.eps.ac.uk

1946 establishments in the United Kingdom
Psychology organisations based in the United Kingdom
Professional associations based in the United Kingdom
Organizations established in 1946